Lieutenant General Sir Henry Marshman Havelock-Allan, 1st Baronet  (6 August 1830 – 30 December 1897) was a British soldier and politician. 'Allan' in the surname was added in March 1880.

Early life
Havelock was born in Cawnpore, India on 6 August 1830, the son of Major General Sir Henry Havelock and his wife, Hannah née Marshman, the daughter of the missionaries Joshua and Hannah Marshman.

Military career
Havelock was commissioned as an Ensign in the 39th Regiment of Foot in March 1846, and joined the Regiment in India. Moving to the 86th Foot as a Lieutenant in June 1848, he transferred to the 10th Regiment of Foot in February 1852. He served in the Persian campaign of 1856–57, and was back in India at the outbreak of the Indian Mutiny in May 1857.

On 16 July 1857 at Cawnpore, the 64th Regiment had suffered badly under artillery fire. When the enemy was seen rallying their last 24-pounder, the order was given to advance, and Havelock immediately placed himself, on his horse, in front of the centre of the 64th, opposite the muzzle of the gun and moved on at a foot pace, in the face of shot and grape fired by the enemy. The advance went steadily on, led by Havelock and finally the gun was rushed and taken by the 64th. For this deed, Havelock was awarded the Victoria Cross. On 25 September 1857 he was badly wounded in the Siege of Lucknow.

On returning to England in 1860, Havelock joined his regiment, now the 18th Foot (Royal Irish Regiment), at Shorncliffe. He became deputy assistant adjutant-general at Aldershot on 1 October 1861. He was posted with the 18th Foot to New Zealand in August 1863, where he was appointed deputy assistant quartermaster-general and served under Major General Duncan Cameron from 1863 to 1864. He participated in the Invasion of Waikato, being present at Rangiriri, Waiari, Paterangi, Rangiawhia, and at the siege and capture of Orakau. For his services during this period, he was Mentioned in Despatches, promoted to major on 28 June 1864, and was made a Companion of the Order of the Bath in August 1866.

In March 1867 Havelock was posted to Canada, where he served as assistant quartermaster-general for two years. He then spent three years in Dublin performing the same role. In 1870 he was given leave of absence to act as a War correspondent in the Franco-Prussian War, being present at the Battle of Sedan. In 1877, he attended the Russo-Turkish War in the same capacity. He was promoted to colonel on 17 June 1868, and major general on 18 March 1878.

Ill health forced Havelock to retire from the active list on 9 December 1881, with the honorary rank of lieutenant general. However, when the Anglo-Egyptian War broke out the following year, he made his way to the British headquarters in Ismaïlia telling a war correspondent: "Don't for goodness' sake mention me in your despatches, for my wife thinks I'm somewhere on the Riviera, but I could not resist coming here to see the fun." He petitioned the British commander, Sir Garnet Wolseley, for a role on the staff; but Wolseley refused, writing to his wife:

Nonetheless, Havelock was able to see action at the battles of Kassassin and Tel el-Kebir, where he supposedly led a charge armed with nothing but a riding crop.

Baronetcy and Member of Parliament

In 1858 Havelock was granted the baronetcy, originally intended for his father (who died a year earlier), and he and his mother were granted a parliamentary pension of £1,000 a year. He later went to England and became a Member of Parliament in 1874 for his father's birth-town of Sunderland until 1881. He inherited Blackwell Grange, the former property of his cousin Robert Allan, changed his surname to Havelock-Allan, (as was required by the will of the latter) and became an MP for South East Durham from 1885 to 1892.

Death
Havelock was re-elected in 1895 and also became Colonel of the Royal Irish Regiment, stationed in India, that year. It was there that he was killed by Afridi clansmen on the Afghanistan side of the Khyber Pass in 1897 and he was later buried in Rawalpindi.

Works
In 1867, Havelock published his Three Main Military Questions of the Day, which addressed the issues of a Home Reserve Army, improved economic military tenure of India and the effects of breechloading arms on cavalry.

References

External links
 

1830 births
1897 deaths
People from Kanpur
Baronets in the Baronetage of the United Kingdom
British Army lieutenant generals
British recipients of the Victoria Cross
Knights Grand Cross of the Order of the Bath
Liberal Party (UK) MPs for English constituencies
UK MPs 1885–1886
UK MPs 1886–1892
UK MPs 1895–1900
British military personnel of the Anglo-Persian War
Indian Rebellion of 1857 recipients of the Victoria Cross
British military personnel of the New Zealand Wars
British military personnel killed in action
Royal Irish Regiment (1684–1922) officers
Deputy Lieutenants of Durham
Royal Lincolnshire Regiment officers
British Army recipients of the Victoria Cross
Liberal Unionist Party MPs for English constituencies
Military personnel of British India